Events from the year 1512 in India.

Events
 Santa Catarina do Monte Sinai built in Kochi, India

See also

 Timeline of Indian history

References